Ednam is a small village near Kelso in the Scottish Borders area of Scotland.

Places nearby include Stichill, Sprouston, Nenthorn, Eccles, Gordon, Greenlaw as well as Floors Castle.

The village was formerly in Roxburghshire. Its name is a corruption of the Anglo-Saxon "Edenham", i.e. the town on Eden Water.

Near the village is a knoll called The Piper's Grave. It is named after a legend that a local piper once went searching for fairies in the hill, and was never seen again.

Notable people
Ednam is notable for having been associated with several Scottish poets, Henry Francis Lyte, writer of Abide With Me; William Wright, John Gibson Smith and James Thomson, writer of Rule Britannia.
J. H. S. Burleigh - Moderator of the General Assembly of the Church of Scotland in 1960.
 William Purves, banker

See also
Ednam Church
List of places in the Scottish Borders
List of places in Scotland

References

External links

RCAHMS record of Ednam
Gazetteer for Scotland: Parish of Ednam
Scottish Borders Council: Adopted Local Plan / Ednam Settlement Profile and Map 
Ednam Primary School, Inspections 
Church of Scotland: Parish of Kelso North and Ednam
 Ednam website

Villages in the Scottish Borders
Parishes in Roxburghshire